Nolina bigelovii (Bigelow's nolina or beargrass) is a flowering plant native to the Southwestern United States, California, and northwest Mexico.

Distribution
In Arizona, Nevada, and southern California, Nolina bigelovii is especially prevalent along the Lower Colorado River Valley, especially in the western Arizona Sonoran Desert, but also regions of the mountains of southern California's Colorado Desert. The species ranges in the Peninsular Ranges of Baja California-(the north state), as well as Isla Ángel de la Guarda in the northern Gulf of California. Its northeast range extent is in the Grand Canyon of Arizona.

Description
The Nolina bigelovii plant is not a grass. The trunklike stem may exceed   in length, part of which may be underground. The semi-stiff, shreddy leaves are arranged in rosettes, with up to 150 per rosette. The bases are thick and fleshy and much wider than the rest of the blade.

The inflorescence may approach  in height. The small flowers each have six whitish tepals a few millimeters in length.

References

External links
Jepson Flora Project: Nolina bigelovii
Flora of North America: Nolina bigelovii; Nolina bigelovii Range Map

USDA Plants Profile: Nolina bigelovii

bigelovii
Flora of Northwestern Mexico
Flora of the Southwestern United States
Flora of the California desert regions
Natural history of the Mojave Desert
Taxa named by John Torrey
Taxa named by Sereno Watson
Flora without expected TNC conservation status